The arrondissement of Poitiers is an arrondissement of France in the Vienne department in the Nouvelle-Aquitaine region. It has 83 communes.

Composition

The communes of the arrondissement of Poitiers, and their INSEE codes, are:

 Amberre (86002)
 Aslonnes (86010)
 Avanton (86016)
 Ayron (86017)
 Beaumont Saint-Cyr (86019)
 Béruges (86024)
 Biard (86027)
 Bignoux (86028)
 Boivre-la-Vallée (86123)
 Bonnes (86031)
 Buxerolles (86041)
 Celle-Lévescault (86045)
 Chabournay (86048)
 Chalandray (86050)
 Champigny en Rochereau (86053)
 La Chapelle-Moulière (86058)
 Chasseneuil-du-Poitou (86062)
 Château-Larcher (86065)
 Chauvigny (86070)
 Cherves (86073)
 Chiré-en-Montreuil (86074)
 Chouppes (86075)
 Cissé (86076)
 Cloué (86080)
 Coulombiers (86083)
 Coussay (86085)
 Croutelle (86088)
 Cuhon (86089)
 Curzay-sur-Vonne (86091)
 Dienné (86094)
 Dissay (86095)
 Fleuré (86099)
 Fontaine-le-Comte (86100)
 Frozes (86102)
 Gizay (86105)
 Iteuil (86113)
 Jardres (86114)
 Jaunay-Marigny (86115)
 Jazeneuil (86116)
 Latillé (86121)
 Lavoux (86124)
 Ligugé (86133)
 Liniers (86135)
 Lusignan (86139)
 Maillé (86142)
 Maisonneuve (86144)
 Marçay (86145)
 Marigny-Chemereau (86147)
 Marnay (86148)
 Massognes (86150)
 Mignaloux-Beauvoir (86157)
 Migné-Auxances (86158)
 Mirebeau (86160)
 Montamisé (86163)
 Neuville-de-Poitou (86177)
 Nieuil-l'Espoir (86178)
 Nouaillé-Maupertuis (86180)
 Poitiers (86194)
 Pouillé (86198)
 La Puye (86202)
 Quinçay (86204)
 Roches-Prémarie-Andillé (86209)
 Rouillé (86213)
 Saint-Benoît (86214)
 Sainte-Radégonde (86239)
 Saint-Georges-lès-Baillargeaux (86222)
 Saint-Julien-l'Ars (86226)
 Saint-Martin-la-Pallu (86281)
 Saint-Sauvant (86244)
 Sanxay (86253)
 Savigny-Lévescault (86256)
 Sèvres-Anxaumont (86261)
 Smarves (86263)
 Tercé (86268)
 Thurageau (86271)
 Vernon (86284)
 La Villedieu-du-Clain (86290)
 Villiers (86292)
 Vivonne (86293)
 Vouillé (86294)
 Vouneuil-sous-Biard (86297)
 Vouzailles (86299)
 Yversay (86300)

History

The arrondissement of Poitiers was created in 1800. At the January 2017 reorganisation of the arrondissements of Vienne, it received four communes from the arrondissement of Châtellerault and two communes from the arrondissement of Montmorillon.

As a result of the reorganisation of the cantons of France which came into effect in 2015, the borders of the cantons are no longer related to the borders of the arrondissements. The cantons of the arrondissement of Poitiers were, as of January 2015:

 Lusignan
 Mirebeau
 Neuville-de-Poitou
 Poitiers-1
 Poitiers-2
 Poitiers-3
 Poitiers-4
 Poitiers-5
 Poitiers-6
 Poitiers-7
 Saint-Georges-lès-Baillargeaux
 Saint-Julien-l'Ars
 La Villedieu-du-Clain
 Vivonne
 Vouillé

References

Poitiers